Douglas Dale Christie (born May 9, 1970) is an American professional basketball coach and former player who is an assistant coach for the Sacramento Kings of the National Basketball Association (NBA). He was formerly a commentator for the Kings on NBC Sports California.

Early life and college career
Born in Seattle, Washington, Christie is the son of John Malone and Norma Christie. He was raised in Seattle by his mother Norma Christie. Christie is biracial as his father is black and his mother is white.

He began playing street ball at a young age, but it was under the guidance of Mark Morris High School coach Dave Denny that his game took off.

"Once I came there, and I put that with the street side of basketball, I noticed great strides", he said. "I was learning the basics of basketball—the things you don't learn on the playground."

Christie played basketball in eighth grade at Cascade Middle School and for Mark Morris High School during his freshman and sophomore years. He had moved to Longview to live with his father, former Mark Morris track star John Malone. He later attended Seattle's Rainier Beach High School. In 1988, his senior year at Beach he led the school's varsity boys' basketball team to their first-ever Washington state championship.

He then went on to Pepperdine University (studying sociology), where he gained national exposure. While at Pepperdine, he was twice named WCC Player of the Year (1991, 1992). He also led the Waves to the NCAA Tournament those two years, averaging over 19 points per game during his final two seasons.

Professional career

Los Angeles Lakers (1993–1994) 
Christie was selected 17th overall in the 1992 NBA draft by the Seattle SuperSonics. However, because of contract difficulties, he never played for the Sonics and was traded to the Los Angeles Lakers, along with Benoit Benjamin, in exchange for Sam Perkins later that season, where in his first game his name was spelled incorrectly on his jersey as "Chrisite." He was used sparingly in Los Angeles.

New York Knicks (1994–1996) 
In 1994, the Lakers traded Christie to the New York Knicks for two second-round draft picks. Again, he did not play often.

Toronto Raptors (1996–2000) 
In 1996, Christie was again traded mid-season, this time to the Toronto Raptors in a package with Herb Williams, for Willie Anderson and Victor Alexander. He stayed with the Raptors until the conclusion of the season in 2000. By then, Christie had picked up his scoring and had been a consistent starter for the Raptors.

Sacramento Kings (2000–2005) 
At the end of the 2000 season, Christie was traded to the Sacramento Kings in exchange for forward Corliss Williamson.  In Sacramento, Christie became the Kings' popular starting shooting guard and developed into one of the league's best defenders, perennially named to the NBA All-Defensive Team; also he was recognized as one of the best 3pt-shooters during this time. Alongside Jason Williams, Peja Stojaković, Chris Webber, and Vlade Divac, the Kings starting five would become known as "The Greatest Show on Court." Christie's defense helped the Kings rise in the NBA ranks, becoming a perennial playoff contender and eventually a championship contender, leading the league in wins in 2001–02.

Orlando Magic (2005) 
In 2005, Christie was traded to the Orlando Magic for Cuttino Mobley and Michael Bradley. He left the Kings as second all-time in total steals. He was unhappy about the trade and played only a few games before being sidelined with bone spurs. Following Christie's ankle surgery, the Orlando Magic released him on August 11, 2005 under the new NBA collective bargaining agreement one-time amnesty clause.

Dallas Mavericks (2005) 
Christie signed a one-year contract with the Dallas Mavericks shortly thereafter.

Due to a slow healing surgically repaired left ankle, Christie was waived by the Dallas Mavericks on November 25, 2005, signaling his impending retirement. He had left the team the week prior to have his surgically repaired left ankle examined by his personal physician.  In seven games with the Dallas Mavericks, Christie averaged 3.7 points and 2.0 assists.

Los Angeles Clippers (2007) 
In January 2007, Christie attempted a comeback when he signed a 10-day contract with the Los Angeles Clippers.  After the All-Star break,  Christie, on his second 10-day contract, decided to part ways with the team.

In 2014, Christie was named to a team assembled by Dennis Rodman as part of his "basketball diplomacy" effort in North Korea with the job of playing an exhibition match against the North Korean Senior National Team to celebrate the birthday of Kim Jong-un.

Personal life

Christie, and his wife Jackie, have three children. In 2002, The New York Times published a feature story in which Doug and his wife Jackie spoke about their marriage and committed lifestyle. The couple remarry every year on their wedding anniversary, complete with guests and festivities.

Christie is a devout Christian.

In 2006, BET's BET J launched the reality show The Christies Committed, featuring the Christies' struggle to balance family and celebrity life.

Jackie is also featured on VH1's reality TV show's Basketball Wives: LA and the main series Basketball Wives.

During a 2012 appearance on The Rickey Smiley Show, Jackie Christie joked that the couple would soon be producing an adult film.

Career statistics

NBA

Regular season

|-
| style="text-align:left;"|
| style="text-align:left;"|L.A. Lakers
| 23 || 0 || 14.4 || .425 || .167 || .758 || 2.2 || 2.3 || 1.0 || .2 || 6.2
|-
| style="text-align:left;"|
| style="text-align:left;"|L.A. Lakers
| 65 || 34 || 23.3 || .434 || .328 || .697 || 3.6 || 2.1 || 1.4 || .4 || 10.3
|-
| style="text-align:left;"|
| style="text-align:left;"|New York
| 12 || 0 || 6.6 || .227 || .143 || .800 || 1.1 || .7 || .2 || .1 || 1.3
|-
| style="text-align:left;"|
| style="text-align:left;"|New York
| 23 || 0 || 9.5 || .479 || .526 || .591 || 1.5 || 1.1 || .5 || .1 || 4.0
|-
| style="text-align:left;"|
| style="text-align:left;"|Toronto
| 32 || 17 || 25.6 || .436 || .414 || .789 || 3.8 || 2.9 || 1.8 || .5 || 10.1
|-
| style="text-align:left;"|
| style="text-align:left;"|Toronto
| 81 || 81 || 38.6 || .417 || .384 || .775 || 5.3 || 3.9 || 2.5 || .3 || 14.5
|-
| style="text-align:left;"|
| style="text-align:left;"|Toronto
| 78 || 78 || 37.7 || .428 || .326 || .829 || 5.2 || 3.6 || 2.4 || .7 || 16.5
|-
| style="text-align:left;"|
| style="text-align:left;"|Toronto
| 50 || 50 || 35.4 || .388 || .304 || .841 || 4.1 || 3.7 || 2.3 || .5 || 15.2
|-
| style="text-align:left;"|
| style="text-align:left;"|Toronto
| 73 || 73 || 31.0 || .407 || .360 || .843 || 3.9 || 4.4 || 1.4 || .6 || 12.4
|-
| style="text-align:left;"|
| style="text-align:left;"|Sacramento
| 81 || 81 || 36.3 || .395 || .376 || .897 || 4.4 || 3.6 || 2.3 || .6 || 12.3
|-
| style="text-align:left;"|
| style="text-align:left;"|Sacramento
| 81 || 81 || 34.5 || .460 || .352 || .851 || 4.6 || 4.2 || 2.0 || .3 || 12.0
|-
| style="text-align:left;"|
| style="text-align:left;"|Sacramento
| 80 || 80 || 33.9 || .479 || .395 || .810 || 4.3 || 4.7 || 2.3 || .5 || 9.4
|-
| style="text-align:left;"|
| style="text-align:left;"|Sacramento
| 82 || 82 || 33.9 || .461 || .345 || .860 || 4.0 || 4.2 || 1.8 || .5 || 10.1
|-
| style="text-align:left;"|
| style="text-align:left;"|Sacramento
| 31 || 31 || 32.1 || .407 || .256 || .893 || 4.0 || 4.9 || 1.4 || .4 || 7.3
|-
| style="text-align:left;"|
| style="text-align:left;"|Orlando
| 21 || 13 || 25.2 || .367 || .217 || .909 || 2.6 || 2.2 || 1.8 || .2 || 5.7
|-
| style="text-align:left;"|
| style="text-align:left;"|Dallas
| 7 || 7 || 26.4 || .346 || .000 || .667 || 1.9 || 2.0 || 1.3 || .1 || 3.7
|-
| style="text-align:left;"|
| style="text-align:left;"|L.A. Clippers
| 7 || 0 || 11.7 || .294 || .167 || .667 || 1.6 || 1.1 || .4 || .1 || 1.9
|- class="sortbottom"
| style="text-align:center;" colspan="2"|Career
| 827 || 708 || 31.5 || .426 || .354 || .821 || 4.1 || 3.6 || 1.9 || .5 || 11.2

Playoffs

|-
| style="text-align:left;"|1993
| style="text-align:left;"|L.A. Lakers
| 5 || 0 || 7.8 || .364 || .333 ||  || .8 || 1.2 || .4 || .4 || 1.8
|-
| style="text-align:left;"|1995
| style="text-align:left;"|New York
| 2 || 0 || 3.0 || .000 ||  ||  || .0 || .0 || .0 || .0 || 0.0
|-
| style="text-align:left;"|2000
| style="text-align:left;"|Toronto
| 3 || 1 || 20.3 || .231 || .375 || .500 || 1.7 || 2.0 || 1.3 || .3 || 4.0
|-
| style="text-align:left;"|2001
| style="text-align:left;"|Sacramento
| 8 || 8 || 38.0 || .368 || .294 || .828 || 4.4 || 3.3 || 2.5 || 1.1 || 9.9
|-
| style="text-align:left;"|2002
| style="text-align:left;"|Sacramento
| 16 || 16 || 40.3 || .409 || .266 || .800 || 5.8 || 4.9 || 2.1 || .6 || 11.1
|-
| style="text-align:left;"|2003
| style="text-align:left;"|Sacramento
| 12 || 12 || 31.8 || .374 || .250 || .935 || 6.2 || 4.6 || 1.0 || .3 || 9.1
|-
| style="text-align:left;"|2004
| style="text-align:left;"|Sacramento
| 12 || 12 || 38.4 || .397 || .394 || .854 || 6.2 || 3.9 || 1.8 || .4 || 13.8
|- class="sortbottom"
| style="text-align:center;" colspan="2"|Career
| 58 || 49 || 32.7 || .382 || .302 || .832 || 4.9 || 3.8 || 1.6 || .5 || 9.5

See also
List of National Basketball Association career steals leaders
List of National Basketball Association single-game steals leaders

References

External links

1970 births
Living people
20th-century African-American sportspeople
21st-century African-American sportspeople
African-American basketball players
African-American Christians
American expatriate basketball people in Canada
American men's basketball players
Basketball players from Seattle
Christians from Washington (state)
Dallas Mavericks players
Los Angeles Clippers players
Los Angeles Lakers players
New York Knicks players
Orlando Magic players
Participants in American reality television series
People from Longview, Washington
Pepperdine Waves men's basketball players
Sacramento Kings players
Sacramento Kings assistant coaches
Seattle SuperSonics draft picks
Shooting guards
Toronto Raptors players